KIKF (104.9 FM) is a radio station broadcasting a country music format. Licensed to Cascade, Montana, United States, the station serves the Great Falls area. The station is currently owned by STARadio Corporation.

References

External links

IKF
Country radio stations in the United States